Quartier du Petit Champlain is a small commercial zone in Quebec City, Quebec, Canada. It is located in the neighbourhood of Vieux-Québec–Cap-Blanc–colline Parlementaire in the borough of La Cité-Limoilou, near Place Royale and its Notre-Dame-des-Victoires Church. Its main street is the Rue du Petit-Champlain at the foot of Cap Diamant. It is claimed that it's the oldest commercial district in North America.

In French it is referred to as a quartier (neighbourhood) although it is not an official one recognised by the City. It is named after Samuel de Champlain, who founded Quebec City in 1608.

Attractions

Rue du Petit-Champlain

Rue du Petit-Champlain fresco

The fresco painted on the side of the building at 102 rue du Petit-Champlain is a trompe-l'œil measuring 100m2 (900 ft2). It represents the history of the district, the bombardments of 1759, the landslides, and the fires which have occurred in the district.

Breakneck Stairs

The Breakneck Stairs or Breakneck Steps (French: Escalier casse-cou), Quebec City's oldest stairway, were built in 1635. Today they are a popular viewpoint for tourists to view rue du Petit-Champlain.

References

External links
 Official site

Shopping districts and streets in Canada
Old Quebec